Ralph Stratford (c. 1300–1354), also known as Ralph Hatton of Stratford, was a medieval Bishop of London.

Early life
Born in Stratford-on-Avon at the beginning of the fourteenth century, Stratford's parents may have been Thomas Hatton (of Warwickshire) and a sister of the bishops John de Stratford and Robert Stratford. He is also related, through them, to Henry de Stratford, Sir Andrew de Stratford and the Archdeacon Thomas de Stratford. He attended Oxford University and was regent MA in 1329.

Career
Stratford's career was closely defined by and linked with his uncles John and Robert.  He was elected 26 January 1340 and consecrated on 12 March 1340. In 1350 the king nominated him for the cardinalate.

Death
Stratford died at Stepney, on 7 or 17 April 1354, and on 28 April his uncle Robert Stratford, bishop of Chichester, granted forty days' indulgence to those who prayed for his soul. He was buried in St Paul's Cathedral.

Citations

References

 

Ralph
Bishops of London
1354 deaths
Year of birth unknown
1300 births
Burials at St Paul's Cathedral
14th-century English Roman Catholic bishops